Consumer Protection Act, 2019 is an Act of the Parliament of India. It repeals and replaces the Consumer Protection Act, 1986.

About 
The Consumer Protection Act
, 2019 was introduced in the Lok Sabha as a replacement of Copra 1986 on 8 July 2019 by the Minister of Consumer Affairs, Food and Public Distribution, Ram Vilas Paswan. It was passed by Lok Sabha on 30 July 2019 and later passed in Rajya Sabha on 6 August 2019.

The bill received assent from President Ram Nath Kovind on 9 August, and was notified in The Gazette of India on the same date. The Act came into effect by 20 July 2020, while certain other provisions of the Act like establishing the Central Consumer Protection Authority came into effect from 24 July 2020.

The Act features focuses on giving customer more power by taking transparency to another level. In September 2020 government declared a new draft known as advertising code which gives customer protection against false advertisements.

Provisions  
The Consumer Protection Act has made it mandatory for every e-commerce entity to display the country of origin.

Rights of consumers 
The consumer protection bill 2019 primarily defines the following consumer rights.

 Be protected against marketing of goods and services which are hazardous to life and property.
 Be informed of the quality, quantity, potency, purity, standard and price of goods and services.
 Be assured of access to a variety of goods or services at competitive prices.
 Seek redressal against unfair and restrictive trade practices.

References

Acts of the Parliament of India 2019
Consumer protection legislation
2019 in Indian law
Consumer protection in India
Ministry of Consumer Affairs, Food and Public Distribution
False advertising law